R (Nicklinson) v Ministry of Justice was a 2014 judgment by the Supreme Court of the United Kingdom that considered the question of the right to die in English law.

Facts
In 2005 Tony Nicklinson suffered a severe stroke and became paralysed from the neck down. He described his life following the stroke as a "living nightmare".

Nicklinson wished to end his life but was unable to commit suicide without assistance. This presented a legal problem because assisting the suicide of another person is a criminal offence under section 2 of the Suicide Act 1961. As such Nicklinson applied to the High Court for a declaration that either:

It would be legal for a doctor to assist in his suicide; or
The present legal regime concerning assisted suicide is incompatible with Article 8 of the European Convention on Human Rights (Right to respect for private and family life)

The second appeal in this case related to an individual using the pseudonym Martin who had suffered a brainstem stroke in 2008. Martin wished to end his life by travelling to the Dignitas clinic in Switzerland and sought an order for the Director of Public Prosecutions (DPP) to amend her 2010 'Policy for Prosecutors in Respect of Cases of Encouraging or Assisting Suicide' so that carers and other responsible individuals who are not family members will not be prosecuted for assisting in Martin's suicide.

Judgment

High Court
The High Court refused both of the declarations that Nicklinson sought. He subsequently refused all food and died of pneumonia on 22 August 2012. His wife took up the case in the appeals to the Court of Appeal and Supreme Court.

Martin's claim also failed in the High Court.

Court of Appeal
The Court of Appeal dismissed Nicklinson's appeal on the basis that the defence of necessity should not be allowed to develop at common law so as to encompass murder in certain cases of euthanasia. Furthermore, a blanket ban on euthanasia was not incompatible with Article 8 of the European Convention on Human Rights. Such an approach was in line with the Debbie Purdy case.

Martin's appeal was partially successful. The court held that the DPP's guidance was not sufficiently clear in respect of people who had no close relationship with the victim.

Nicklinson and the DPP appealed to the Supreme Court. Martin cross-appealed.

Supreme Court
A majority of five justices (Neuberger, Hale, Mance, Kerr, Wilson) held that the court does have the constitutional authority to make a declaration of incompatibility as regards the general prohibition of assisted suicide. Lord Neuberger concluded:

This majority felt that the question is one that Parliament is in a much better position than the courts to assess.

In a dissenting opinion, Lady Hale and Lord Kerr would have made a declaration of incompatibility as requested by Nicklinson. Lady Hale stated:

Although the other seven justices would not have issued such a declaration it was unanimously held that the question of assisted suicide does fall within the United Kingdom's margin of appreciation and does engage Article 8 of the European Convention on Human Rights.

The Supreme Court unanimously allowed the DPP's appeal and holds that:

Given this conclusion Martin's cross-appeal did not arise.

European Court of Human Rights
In December 2014 Tony Nicklinson's wife, Jane, applied to bring a case before the European Court of Human Rights.

On 23 June 2015 the court decided that the question of assisted suicide falls within a state's margin of appreciation. It concluded that:

As such Nicklinson's application was "manifestly ill-founded" and therefore declared inadmissible.

Assisted Dying Bill
In June 2014 Lord Falconer tabled a private members' bill in the House of Lords entitled the "Assisted Dying Bill" but it ran out of debating time during that parliament.

In June 2015 Labour MP Rob Marris topped the ballot for private member's bills and indicated that he would introduce a bill that adopted Lord Falconer's draft regulations. Although Nicklinson was mentioned during the debates, the Assisted Dying Bill as proposed would have been limited to those with six months or less to live and therefore he would not have been able to utilise the law to access an assisted death. The bill failed to pass the second reading debate on 11 September 2015 as 118 MPs voted for the bill progressing while 330 voted against.

See also
Right to die
Assisted suicide in the United Kingdom 
Autonomy
Article 8 of the European Convention on Human Rights
Tony Nicklinson
2014 Judgments of the Supreme Court of the United Kingdom
Pretty v United Kingdom

References

External links
R (Nicklinson) v Ministry of Justice [2014] UKSC 38
Video of the Supreme Court judgment
Nicklinson and Lamb v UK (application nos. 2478/15 and 1787/15)

Supreme Court of the United Kingdom cases
2014 in British law
2014 in case law
Assisted suicide
Euthanasia in the United Kingdom